The 2015 Scottish Rugby U-20 Championship will be contested from August – October 2015. The tournament is run by the Scottish Rugby Union and will be competed for by the 4 regional teams from the BT Sport Scottish Rugby Academy.

The U-20 Championship is three rounds of the regional round-robin, which takes in the autumn, and concludes with a final in October.

Teams

The following teams took part in the inaugural 2015 Scottish Rugby U-20 Championship:

Standings

The round robin standings for the 2015 Scottish Rugby U-20 Championship were:

Round-by-round

The table below shows each team's progression throughout the season. For each round, their cumulative points total is shown with the overall log position in brackets:

Fixtures and results

The following matches were played in the 2015 Scottish Rugby U-20 Championship:

 All times are GMT.

Round One

Round Two

Round Three

Finals

Champions final

Third place final

References

2015-16
2015–16 in Scottish rugby union